The Talons of Weng-Chiang is the sixth and final serial of the 14th season of the British science fiction television series Doctor Who, which was first broadcast in six weekly parts on BBC1 from 26 February to 2 April 1977. In the serial, which is set in 19th-century London, the 51st century criminal Magnus Greel (Michael Spice) travels to the city and poses as an ancient Chinese god to find his missing time machine.

Written by script editor Robert Holmes and directed by David Maloney, The Talons of Weng-Chiang was also the final serial to be produced by Philip Hinchcliffe, who had worked on the series for three seasons. One of the most popular serials from the series' original run on television, The Talons of Weng-Chiang has continued to receive acclaim from reviewers and it has been repeatedly voted one of the best stories by fans. Despite this, criticism has been directed towards the serial's stereotypical representation of Chinese characters and an unconvincing giant rat featured in the story.

Plot
The Doctor and Leela arrive in London so that Leela can learn about the customs of her ancestors. Performing at the Palace Theatre is the stage magician Li H'sen Chang. On their way to the theatre, the Doctor and Leela encounter a group of Chinese men who have apparently killed a cab driver. All but one escape, and he, the Doctor and Leela are taken to the local police station.

At the station, Li H'sen Chang is called in to act as an interpreter, but unbeknownst to everyone else he is the leader of the group – the Tong of the Black Scorpion, followers of the god Weng-Chiang. He stealthily gives the captive henchman a pill of concentrated scorpion venom, which the henchman takes and dies.

The body is taken to the local mortuary, along with the body of the cabbie. There they meet Professor Litefoot, who is performing the autopsies. The cabbie is Joseph Buller, who had been looking for his wife Emma, the latest in a string of missing women in the area. Buller had gone down to the Palace Theatre where he had confronted Chang about his wife's disappearance. Afterwards, Chang had sent his men, including the diminutive Mr Sin, to kill Buller. Chang is in the service of Magnus Greel, a despot from the 51st century who had fled from the authorities in a time cabinet, now masquerading as the Chinese god Weng-Chiang. The technology of the cabinet is unstable and has disrupted Greel's own DNA, deforming him horribly. This forces him to drain the life essences from young women to keep himself alive. At the same time, Greel is in search of his cabinet, which is now in the possession of Professor Litefoot. Mr Sin is also from the future but is a robotic toy constructed with the cerebral cortex of a pig.

Greel tracks down the time cabinet and steals it, whilst concurrently the Doctor tracks Greel to the sewers underneath the theatre, aided by the theatre's owner, Henry Gordon Jago. However, Greel has already fled, abandoning Chang to the police. Chang escapes into the sewers, only to be mauled by one of Greel's giant rats.

While the Doctor and Leela try to find Greel's new hideout, Jago comes across the key to the time cabinet. He takes it to Professor Litefoot's house, and there, after leaving the key and a note for the Doctor, the Professor and Jago set out to follow anyone coming around the theatre in search of the bag. However, they are captured. Meanwhile, the Doctor and Leela find Chang in an opium den, dying from his injury. The Doctor and Leela ask where Greel can be found, and Chang tells them he can be found in the House of the Dragon, but dies before he can give them the exact location.

The Doctor and Leela return to Professor Litefoot's house. There they find the note and the key to the time cabinet. They decide to wait for Greel and his henchmen. When they arrive, the Doctor uses the key, a fragile crystal, as a bargaining chip. He asks to be taken to the House of the Dragon, offering the key in exchange for Litefoot and Jago's release. Instead, Greel overpowers the Doctor and locks him in with the two.

Leela, who had been left at Litefoot's house, has followed them and confronts Greel. She is captured by Greel, but before her life essence is drained, the Doctor, Jago and Litefoot escape and rescue her. In a final confrontation, Mr Sin turns on Greel as the Doctor convinces it that Greel escaping in his time cabinet will create a catastrophic implosion. The Doctor defeats Greel by forcibly pushing him into his own extraction machine, causing it to overload and Greel to disintegrate. The Doctor then captures and deactivates Mr Sin.

Production
A Robert Banks Stewart story outline called The Foe from the Future inspired elements of this serial. The Foe from the Future was adapted by Big Finish Productions as an audio play in 2012. Working titles for this story included The Talons of Greel. This was the final Doctor Who story produced by Philip Hinchcliffe. His successor, Graham Williams, sat in on this story's production. This story featured John Nathan-Turner's first work as an uncredited production unit manager on the series, with the credit going to Chris D'Oyly-John. Nathan-Turner would become the series' regular production unit manager under Williams and succeed Williams as the show's producer from 1980 to 1989.

The Talons of Weng-Chiang featured two separate blocks of location shooting. As planned, the serial was to have a week of location filming for the exterior footage, which took place at various locations in London, with the majority in the area around Wapping, in mid-December 1976, followed by three studio recording sessions. Producer Philip Hinchcliffe was able to negotiate the swapping of one of the planned studio sessions for the use of an outside broadcast video crew, which led to the second block of location shooting in early January 1977, encompassing a week in Northampton, the majority of which was spent at the Royal Theatre.

A large pile of straw seen in one scene was placed there to cover a modern car that had not been moved off the street. The production team briefly considered giving Jago and Litefoot their own spin-off series.

The production of this serial featured in a BBC 2 documentary, Whose Doctor Who (1977), presented by Melvyn Bragg, which was part of the arts series The Lively Arts. Including interviews with Tom Baker, Philip Hinchcliffe and fans of the series, it was the first in-depth documentary made by the BBC on the series and was transmitted on the day following the final episode. The programme is included as an extra on the DVD releases of The Talons of Weng-Chiang.

Cast notes
Deep Roy, who played Mr. Sin, had an uncredited role as an unnamed alien trade delegate in The Trial of a Time Lord: Mindwarp (1986). Dudley Simpson—who composed much of the music for Doctor Who in the 1960s and 1970s—has a cameo as the conductor of Jago's theatre orchestra. Michael Spice appears in this story as the main villain, Magnus Greel. He also provided the voice of Morbius in the previous season's The Brain of Morbius (1976). John Bennett had previously appeared in Doctor Who as General Finch in Invasion of the Dinosaurs (1974). Christopher Benjamin had previously appeared in Inferno (1970) as Sir Keith Gold and would return to play Colonel Hugh in "The Unicorn and the Wasp" (2008).

Broadcast and reception
 

Paul Cornell, Martin Day, and Keith Topping, in The Discontinuity Guide (1995), praised the double act of Jago and Litefoot and called the serial "One of the great moments of Doctor Who history – an effortless conquering of the pseudo-historical genre with a peerless script."  In The Television Companion (1998), David J. Howe and Stephen James Walker were full of similar praise for the script, direction, the characters, and acting. Patrick Mulkern of Radio Times awarded it five stars out of five and wrote, "The Talons of Weng-Chiang as a whole is a scriptwriting tour de force. With its theatrical milieu, florid dramatis personae and high horror quotient, it makes for Doctor Who at its most blatantly Grand Guignol." The A.V. Club reviewer Christopher Bahn wrote that the story was good at "genre-blending" and homages. In Doctor Who: The Complete Guide, Mark Campbell awarded it seven out of ten, describing it as "groaning under the weight of so much clichéd Victoriana, Talons emerges as a garish hybrid of science fiction and literary pastiche. If watched in one go, the lack of subtlety can be draining."

In 2008, The Daily Telegraph named the serial the best of the "10 greatest episodes of Doctor Who" up to that point, writing, "The top-notch characterisation, direction and performances, with Tom Baker at the top of his game, make this the perfect Doctor Who story." This story was voted the best Doctor Who story ever in the 2003 Outpost Gallifrey poll to mark the series' 40th anniversary, narrowly beating The Caves of Androzani. In Doctor Who Magazine 2009 "Mighty 200" poll, asking readers to rank all of the then-released 200 stories, The Talons of Weng-Chiang came in fourth place. In a similar poll in 2014, magazine readers ranked the episode in sixth place. Russell T Davies, lead writer and executive producer for Doctor Whos 21st-century revival, praised this serial, saying, "Take The Talons of Weng-Chiang, for example. Watch episode one. It's the best dialogue ever written. It's up there with Dennis Potter. By a man called Robert Holmes. When the history of television drama comes to be written, Robert Holmes won't be remembered at all because he only wrote genre stuff. And that, I reckon, is a real tragedy."

Although the script and the general production of the serial has been highly praised, some commentators have criticised elements of it such as the realisation of the giant rat and the depiction of the Chinese characters. Patrick Mulkern, in his Radio Times review, acknowledged the "wretched realisation of the giant rat". In his volume of British history State of Emergency, Dominic Sandbrook criticizes the giant rat for being "one of the worst-realized monsters not merely in the show's history, but in the history of human entertainment." Howe and Walker noted that its flaw was the realisation of the giant rat, though the story "still contains its fair share of gruesome and disturbing material". Future Doctor Who executive producer Steven Moffat said in 1995: "How could a good hack think that the BBC could make a giant rat? If he'd come to my house when I was 14 and said 'Can BBC Special Effects do a giant rat?' I'd have said no. I'd rather see them do something limited than something crap. What I resented was having to go to school two days later, and my friends knew I watched this show. They'd go 'Did you see the giant rat?!' and I'd have to say I thought there was dramatic integrity elsewhere."

The depiction of Chinese characters and culture, and use of yellowface in the serial, has been criticised as racist.  Some of the English characters display racist attitudes towards the Chinese characters, which go unchallenged by the Doctor, who normally stands up for marginalized groups. Meanwhile, the Chinese immigrants themselves are portrayed in a stereotypical fashion – other than Li H'sen Chang (a major villain who is himself akin to Fu Manchu, but portrayed by a white actor – another source of criticism), all of the Chinese characters are coolies or members of Tong gangs. The Chinese Canadian National Council for Equality characterized the content of the episodes as "dangerous, offensive, racist stereotyping [which] associate the Chinese with everything fearful and despicable". As a result of their complaint to TVOntario, the Canadian channel chose not to broadcast all six episodes of the serial. Christopher Bahn wrote, "If it wasn't for the uncomfortably racist aspects of the story, it'd be close to perfection." In 2013, Digital Spy placed it in the Top 10 of Doctor Who, while commenting that "Holmes's desire to reflect the UK's 1970s fascination with mysticism and the martial arts led to a rather unfortunate depiction of Asian culture." In 2020, streaming service BritBox added trigger warnings to the serial after the suitability of continuing to host it on the service was called into question by viewers. It was also the subject of a discussion focusing on the representation of ethnicity on archive TV at the British Film Institute.

Commercial releases

In print

A novelisation of this serial, written by Terrance Dicks, was published by Target Books in November 1977, entitled Doctor Who and The Talons of Weng-Chiang.

The script was published by Titan Books in November 1989, entitled "Doctor Who – The Scripts: The Talons of Weng-Chiang" and edited by John McElroy.

Home media
The Talons of Weng-Chiang was released in omnibus format on VHS in the UK in 1988, having previously been available only in Australia. The fight scene between the Doctor and the Tong of the Black Scorpion in Part One was slightly edited to remove the use of the nunchaku (or chain-sticks), which were at the time classed as illegal weapons in the UK and couldn't be shown on-screen — a ruling which has since changed.

The story was released in complete and unedited episodic format on DVD in April 2003 in a two-disc set as part of the Doctor Who 40th Anniversary Celebration releases, representing the Tom Baker years. On 2 September 2008, this serial was released for sale on iTunes. A special edition version of the story was released on DVD as part of the "Revisitations 1" box set in October 2010.

References

External links

Target novelisation

On Target — Doctor Who and the Talons of Weng-Chiang

1977 British television episodes
Doctor Who pseudohistorical serials
Doctor Who serials novelised by Terrance Dicks
Doctor Who stories set on Earth
Fourth Doctor serials
Race-related controversies in television
Television episodes set in the 19th century
Television episodes set in London
Victorian era in popular culture